Norman Carter Fassett (March 27, 1900 – September 14, 1954) was an American botanist and professor, known as an expert on the aquatic flora of Wisconsin.

Career
Fassett was born in Ware, Massachusetts. He studied at Harvard University, eventually earning his Ph.D. in 1925. That year, he was appointed an instructor of botany at the University of Wisconsin. By 1944, he advanced to full professor and was curator of the university herbarium. Under his direction, the herbarium grew from a size of 96,000 specimens to 380,000 specimens. Fassett personally collected over 28,000. From 1948 to 1949, he was chair of the botany department.

Fassett participated in the Colombian Cinchona Mission, where he was part of a group searching for and studying Cinchona trees during World War II. He later participated in research expeditions in Guatemala, El Salvador, and Nicaragua.

From 1945 to 1950, Fassett served as chairman of the Natural Areas Committee of the Wisconsin Department of Natural Resources. He led the effort to establish Parfrey’s Glen as a scientific research area.

Fassett was a founding member of the American Society of Plant Taxonomists in 1935, and served as the president of the organization for the year proceeding his death. He died of a brain tumor in Boothbay Harbor, Maine on September 14, 1954.

Publications
Fassett authored over 100 professional papers, most concerning the flora of North America.

Eponyms
Several species were named in honor of Fassett, including:
Callitriche fassettii Schotsman, 1966
Elatine fassettiana  Steyerm., 1952
Eleocharis fassettii S.González & P.M.Peterson, 2008
Tillandsia fassettii L.B.Sm., 1955

References

Botanists with author abbreviations
American botanists
1900 births
1954 deaths
People from Ware, Massachusetts
University of Wisconsin–Madison faculty
Harvard University alumni
Deaths from brain cancer in the United States